Marie Beatrice "Bea" Schol-Schwarz (12 July 1898 – 27 July 1969) was the Dutch phytopathologist who discovered the causal fungus of Dutch elm disease. She first studied pathogens afflicting peanuts and later the fungus Phialophora.

Biography 
Marie Beatrice Schwarz was born on 12 July 1898 in Batavia in the Dutch East Indies (present-day Jakarta, Indonesia).

She studied at the Utrecht University in the Netherlands, where she was Johanna Westerdijk's first PhD student. During her studies in 1922, she discovered the causal fungus of Dutch elm disease. Schwarz spent most of her early professional life studying pathogens afflicting the groundnut Arachis hypogaea at the agricultural research station in Bogor.

The elm tree Ulmus × hollandica 'Bea Schwarz' was named for her in recognition of her research into the cause of Dutch elm disease.

Marrying in 1926, she retired from research to raise a family. When the East Indies were invaded by the Japanese army in 1942, Schwarz and her husband were interned in separate camps, her husband dying soon afterwards. After liberation, Schwarz and her two sons returned to the Netherlands, where she joined the Centraal Bureau voor Schimmelcultures (Central Bureau for Fungus Cultures) in Baarn, studying various fungi and writing a monograph on the genus Epicoccum.

After her second retirement, she continued to study the genus Phialophora despite her rapidly failing health. Shortly before her death in 1969, she was made an Officer in the Order of Orange Nassau in recognition of her contribution to phytopathology 

Schwarz died on 27 July 1969, at the age of 71, in Baarn.

Eponymy 
The elm cultivar 'Bea Schwarz' was named for Dr. Schwarz.

References 

1898 births
1969 deaths
Dutch mycologists
Dutch phytopathologists
Dutch women scientists
People from Batavia, Dutch East Indies
Utrecht University alumni
Women phytopathologists
Women in forestry
20th-century women scientists
20th-century agronomists